Richard Elias Anderson (born November 30, 1977) is a Canadian former professional basketball player who last played for the Halifax Rainmen at the center position.  He is currently an assistant coach at Carleton University.

Achievements with club

Mattersburg 49ers
Austrian Basketball Cup: 2002
BC Rakvere Tarvas
Estonian Championship: 
Runner-up: 2010

References

External links
2002 FIBA World Championship
1999 Tournament of the Americas
Richard Anderson at basket.ee (in Estonian)

1977 births
Living people
BC Rakvere Tarvas players
BC Tallinn Kalev players
BC Valga players
Canadian men's basketball players
Centers (basketball)
Expatriate basketball people in Estonia
Simon Fraser Clan men's basketball players
Basketball players from Ottawa
2002 FIBA World Championship players